The contest between The Wallabies and The Springboks is one of the major rivalries in rugby union.
The teams' first meeting was on 8 July 1933 at Newlands in Cape Town in the first of 5 tests on the 1933 Wallabies tour. The test was won 17–3 by South Africa who also won that first series 3–2.

South Africa has a better than 57% winning record against Australia, and before the era of sporting boycotts, dominated the early encounters up to 1971.

Both sides have exhibited a considerable home advantage, with the Springboks winning more than 75% of matches played in South Africa, and the Wallabies winning more than 60% of matches played in Australia.

In the amateur era, the Springboks made five tours to Australia, and were undefeated in three of them. South Africa won three of the five test series they played in Australia; 2–0 in 1937, 2-0 in 1956 and 3–0 in 1971. By contrast, the Wallabies made six tours to South Africa, only once making it through undefeated, albeit on a tour comprising only four matches and one test in 1992. Prior to that, Australia's best away tour was the 2-all drawn test series of 1963.

Prior to 1972, South African teams were racially selected, organised by the whites-only South African Rugby Board. Australia then supported the international boycott of sporting contacts with South Africa over the issue of apartheid. The teams did not meet again until 1992, when apartheid was being dismantled and the SARB had merged with the non-racial South African Rugby Union. Since that time Australia has won just over 50% of their games and has won the Mandela Plate nine times in the twelve years since its inception.

In the professional era, extended tours of each country have been replaced by participation in an annual series involving the top teams of the Southern Hemisphere. From 1996 through 2011, Australia and South Africa competed alongside New Zealand in the Tri Nations series. Starting in 2012, the three nations competed alongside Argentina in The Rugby Championship. In the Tri Nations era, the Wallabies and Springboks played two or three encounters each year on a home-and-away basis; the Rugby Championship features two annual encounters, also on a home-and-away basis.

Rugby World Cup
Australia and South Africa have met three times in the Rugby World Cup. In 1995 they were drawn in the same pool and host nation South Africa won 27–18, going on to win the cup. In 1999 Australia knocked South Africa out of the competition in a semi-final at Twickenham, winning 27–21, after extra-time. In 2011, Australia again knocked South Africa out of the competition, in a quarter-final at Westpac Stadium in Wellington, winning 11–9.

Summary

Overall

Records
Note: Date shown in brackets indicates when the record was or last set.

Results

XV results
Below is a list of matches that Australia has retrospectively awarded matches test match status by virtue of awarding caps, but South Africa did not award caps.

List of series

See also

Mandela Challenge Plate

Notes

References

External links

 
Australia national rugby union team matches
South Africa national rugby union team matches
Rugby union rivalries in Australia
Rugby union rivalries in South Africa
rugby union